Crookwell Shire was a local government area in the Southern Tablelands region of New South Wales, Australia.

Crookwell  Shire was proclaimed on 7 March 1906, one of 134 shires created after the passing of the Local Government (Shires) Act 1905. 

The shire office was in Crookwell. Towns and villages in the shire included  Bigga.

Crookwell Shire was amalgamated with parts of Gunning Shire, Mulwaree Shire and Yass Shire to form Upper Lachlan Shire on 11 February 2004.

References

Former local government areas of New South Wales
1906 establishments in Australia
2004 disestablishments in Australia